The 2010 Armenian Premier League season was the nineteenth since its establishment. The season began in March 2010 and ended in November 2010. FC Pyunik were the defending champions, having won their twelfth championship last season.

Participating teams
Ararat Yerevan finished in last place last season and were relegated to the Armenian First League. Taking their place this year is Impuls FC Dilijan, who finished first in the 2009 Armenian First League.

League table

Results
The league was played in four stages. The teams have played four times with each other, twice at home and twice away, for a total of 28 matches per team.

First half of season

Second half of season

Top goalscorers
Including matches played on November 14, 2010; Source: ffa.am

See also
 2010 Armenian First League
 2010 Armenian Cup

References

External links
 ffa.am
 soccerway.com
 uefa.com
 rsssf.com

Armenian Premier League seasons
1
Armenia
Armenia